Michael Gold (April 12, 1894 – May 14, 1967) was the pen-name of Jewish American writer Itzok Isaac Granich. A lifelong communist, Gold was a novelist and literary critic. His semi-autobiographical novel Jews Without Money (1930) was a bestseller. During the 1930s and 1940s, Gold was considered the preeminent author and editor of U.S. proletarian literature.

Background 

Gold was born Itzok Isaac Granich on April 12, 1894, on the Lower East Side of New York City to Romanian Jewish immigrant parents, Chaim Granich and Gittel Schwartz Granich. He had two brothers, Max and George.

Career

Mike Gold published his first writings under the name Irwin Granich. He reportedly took the pseudonym Michael Gold at the time of the Palmer Raids on radicals in 1919-20 from a Jewish veteran of the American Civil War whom he admired for having fought to "free the slaves."

The Masses, a socialist journal edited by Floyd Dell and Max Eastman, published his first pieces in August, 1914. "Three Whose Hatred Killed Them" is a poem about anarchists killed in a Lexington Avenue tenement by their own bomb. Gold praised their "pure intentions". Until his death, he was an ardent supporter of the Bolshevik Revolution of 1917 and of the Soviet Union in all its phases. In 1921-22 Gold and Claude McKay became Executive Editors of Max Eastman's magazine The Liberator. In 1922, Gold wrote: "The Russian Bolsheviks will leave the world a better place than Jesus left it. They will leave it on the threshold of the final victory—the poor will have bread and peace and culture in another generation, not churches and a swarm of lying parasite minister dogs, the legacy of Jesus."

In 1925, Gold visited Moscow. In 1926, he was a founding editor of The New Masses, which published leftist works and also set up radical theater groups. Gold served as editor-in-chief from June 1928 until 1934. At both The Liberator and The New Masses, he favored publishing letters, poems and fiction by ordinary workers over works by literary leftists of bourgeois backgrounds.

One of the widely noted articles he wrote for The New Masses was "Gertrude Stein: A Literary Idiot". Here he charged that her works "resemble the monotonous gibberings of paranoiacs in the private wards of asylums ... The literary idiocy of Gertrude Stein only reflects the madness of the whole system of capitalist values. It is part of the signs of doom that are written largely everywhere on the walls of bourgeois society."

In "Proletarian Realism" (1930), Gold said of Marcel Proust: "The worst example and the best of what we do not want to do is the spectacle of Proust, master-masturbator of the bourgeois literature." He also assailed the Pulitzer Prize winner Thornton Wilder in equally vitriolic terms.

Throughout the 1920s Gold worked on his only novel, Jews Without Money, a fictionalized autobiography about growing up in the impoverished world of the Lower East Side. Published in 1930, shortly after the onset of the Great Depression, it was an immediate success and went through many print-runs in its first years and was translated into over 14 languages. It became a prototype for the American proletarian novel.  In his Author's Note to the novel, Gold wrote, "I have told in my book a tale of Jewish poverty in one ghetto, that of New York. The same story can be of a hundred other ghettoes scattered over all the world. For centuries the Jew has lived in this universal ghetto."  The popularity of Jews Without Money made Gold a national figure and cultural commissar of the Communist Party. He was a daily columnist for its paper, the Daily Worker, until his death.  Gold himself was fond of repeating a quote from the novel: "O workers' Revolution!... You are the true Messiah!" Critic Richard Tuerk has described Jews Without Money as being "the story of the education of a radical", and a "carefully worked, unified piece of work."

The American Communist and labor-organizer Fred Beal described Gold in Moscow in the early thirties as "sentimental revolutionist", anxious "to impress people with his 'proletarian' childhood", and with an intense destestation for liberals.

As a critic, Gold fiercely denounced left-wing authors who he believed had deviated from the Communist Party line. Among those Gold denounced were screenwriter Albert Maltz and "renegade" Ernest Hemingway, who while never a Communist had been sympathetic to leftist causes but came under fire by some for his writing on the Spanish Civil War in For Whom the Bell Tolls. Hemingway responded with "Go tell Mike Gold, Ernest Hemingway says he should go fuck himself."

Personal life and death

Gold was once romantically involved with Dorothy Day.

Gold died in Terra Linda, California, on May 14, 1967, from complications following a stroke. He was 73 years old.

Legacy
Gold's papers reside at the Tamiment Library and Robert F. Wagner Archives at New York University in New York City.

Alice Neel painted Gold's portrait in 1952 and then again after his death.

Footnotes

Works 
Life of John Brown. Girard, KS: Haldeman-Julius, 1924.
Proletarian Song Book of Lyrics from the Operetta "The Last Revolution." With J. Ramirez and Rudolph Liebich. Chicago: Local Chicago, Workers Party of America, 1925.
The Damned Agitator and Other Stories. Chicago: Daily Worker Publishing, 1927. —Little Red Library #7.
Hoboken Blues: a white fantasy on a black theme, in three acts. 1928.
120 Million. New York: International Publishers, 1929.
Fiesta: A Play in Three Acts. 1929.
Money: A Play in One Act. New York: Samuel French, 1930.
Jews Without Money. New York: International Publishers, 1930.
Charlie Chaplin's Parade. New York: Harcourt, Brace, 1930.
Proletarian Literature in the United States: An Anthology. (Contributor.) New York: International Publishers, 1935.
Change the World! New York: International Publishers, 1936.
"Battle Hymn": A Play in Three Acts. With Michael Blankfort. New York: Play Bureau, Federal Theatre Project, 1936.
The Hollow Men. New York: International Publishers, 1941.
David Burliuk: Artist-Scholar, Father of Russian Futurism. New York: A.C.A. Gallery, 1944.
Rhymes for Our Times. With Bill Silverman and William Avstreih. Bronx, NY: Lodge 600, Jewish People's Fraternal Order of the International Workers Order, 1946.
The Mike Gold Reader. New York: International Publishers, 1954.

Further reading

 Berman, Paul. "East Side Story: Mike Gold, the Communists, and the Jews," Radical America, vol. 17, no. 4 (July-Aug. 1983), pp. 39–53.
 Bloom, James. Left Letters: The Culture Wars of Mike Gold and Joseph Freeman. Columbia University Press, 1992.
 Booker, M. Keith, ed. Encyclopedia of Literature and Politics: Censorship, Revolution, and Writing A-Z. [3 vols.] Greenwood Publishing Group, 2005.
 Foley, Barbara. Radical Representations: Politics and Form in U.S. Proletarian Fiction, 1929-1941. Duke University Press, 1993.
 Pyros, John. Mike Gold: Dean of American Proletarian Literature. New York: Dramatika, 1979.
 Rideout, Walter B. The Radical Novel in the United States: 1900-1954: Some Interrelations of Literature and Society. New York: Hill & Wang, 1966.
 James A. Michener Art Museum:  Bucks County Artists - Michael Gold
 Rubin, Rachel (2000). 'J'ewish Gangsters of Modern Literature'', Chicago: University of Illinois Press.

External links
 Michael Gold. Jews Without Money Full text at the Internet Archive.
 Michael Gold. Change the World! Full text at the Internet Archive.
 Guide to the Grace Granich and Max Granich Papers, 1929-1998. Tamiment Library, New York University, New York City.
 Michael Gold. Spartacus Educational article.
 Michael Gold at Goodreads

1894 births
1967 deaths
20th-century American novelists
American communists
American male journalists
Journalists from New York City
American literary critics
American male novelists
American people of Romanian-Jewish descent
Jewish socialists
American Marxist journalists
American Marxist writers
Members of the Communist Party USA
Writers from New York City
Jewish American novelists
American Communist writers
Novelists from New York (state)
20th-century American male writers